The women's discus throw at the 2012 European Athletics Championships was held at the Helsinki Olympic Stadium on 30 June and 1 July.

Medalists

Records

Schedule

Results

Qualification
Qualification: Qualification Performance 61.00 (Q) or at least 12 best performers advance to the final

Final

References

Qualification Results
Final Results

Discus Throw
Discus throw at the European Athletics Championships
2012 in women's athletics